The history of Dreamworld dates back to the mid-1970s when John Longhurst envisioned the future theme park. After a seven-year construction period, Dreamworld officially opened to the public on 15 December 1981. Now owned by publicly listed Ardent Leisure, the park has seen many expansions, closures and replacements over its 30-year history.

The tower houses The Giant Drop (once the world's tallest and fastest drop tower) and once housed the Tower of Terror II (once the world's tallest and fastest roller coaster). Other thrill rides at the park include The Claw, The Gold Coaster, Mick Doohan's Motocoaster Pandamonium and Tail Spin. The park also features two children's areas based upon DreamWorks Animation and The Wiggles, respectively. A wide collection of flat rides rounds out the attraction lineup.

Throughout 2011, Dreamworld celebrated its 30th birthday by investing money in a variety of attractions over the course of the year.

Design and construction
In 1968, entrepreneur John Longhurst took his children to a zoo in Sydney and subsequently felt he could develop something better. After reading a newspaper article describing Disneyland as "a real Dream World", Longhurst registered the name Dreamworld as a trademark on 10 May 1973. One year later, he purchased  of land beside the Pacific Motorway in Coomera. Over a 7-year period,  of this land was developed to form the Dreamworld theme park.

Longhurst also had a hand in constructing the park. He personally spent 12 hours a day, every day for two-and-a-half years to excavate and develop the Murrissipi River in the centre of the park. A paddle steamer, named the Captain Sturt Paddlewheeler, was later added to the river prior to the opening of the park.

In the late 1970s, Longhurst was joined by Sydney furniture salesman Ken Lord. The additional funding provided by Lord allowed Longhurst to embrace his peer-described characteristic of being a perfectionist. This characteristic was on display when he employed some of the designers responsible for Disneyland and Walt Disney World. These architects were responsible for such buildings as the City Hall (entrance building) and IMAX Theatre which closely resemble the Walt Disney World Railroad's station in Main Street U.S.A. and the Emporium at the Magic Kingdom, respectively. A collection of Australian architects had the task to design further buildings which mimicked Australian pioneer buildings.

Longhurst had previously experienced the film To Fly! in an IMAX theatre and wanted to bring that concept to the park. To cater for the 7-storey tall screen, 3 storeys were excavated to allow the screen to fit within a 4-storey building. Seating for 426 people and a $60,000 sound system completed Dreamworld's IMAX Theatre.

A steam-powered railway was the third attraction Longhurst envisaged for the park. The train was originally used during the First World War in France before being relocated to Queensland for use on the cane fields. At the time of its opening, the Cannonball Express was the Longest privately owned railway in Australia. Although the ride's name has been changed to the Dreamworld Railway, it retains this record to this day.

Fourteen replicas of 1911 Model T Fords were purchased at a cost of $12,000 each to develop the Model T Fords attraction. The ride saw guests drive their own car along a rail-guided figure-8 track. The ride still exists to this day (albeit at a different location) under the name Avis Vintage Cars. The Gilltraps Auto Museum was relocated to Dreamworld to showcase the workings of vintage cars as well as the restoration process of vintage cars.

To further diversify the park's offerings a log flume was constructed. The Rocky Hollow Log Ride would see up to four guests board a fibreglass boat and navigate a  flume culminating in a drop at the finish.

Longhurst felt this collection of attractions would satisfy all age groups.

Opening

Dreamworld was officially opened on 15 December 1981 by the Premier of Queensland of the time, Sir Joh Bjelke-Petersen along with park mascot Kenny Koala. At the time, the park employed a total of 220 employees and operated from 10am – 5pm, Tuesday to Thursday. Dreamworld was described as "Australia's answer to Disneyland" by the media – a title supported by the park due to its focus on quality. It was notable at the time for being one of the very few attractions on the Gold Coast where a single admission fee covered unlimited turns on all of the rides and attractions. This admission fee was $11.50 for an adult and $7.50 for a child. The park welcomed 450 guests on its first day of operation. Within the first four months of operation, Dreamworld attracted 250,000 guests and was predicted to be the biggest tourist attraction in the Southern Hemisphere by the mid-1980s.

1980s
In the months following Dreamworld's opening the park set about constructing more rides, shows and attractions. In April 1982, Dreamworld opened a new themed area titled Country Fair. The flagship attraction was the Thunderbolt roller coaster. This steel roller coaster was designed by Japanese firm Sanoyas Hishino Meisho and was Australia's first looping roller coaster. Other attractions in the area included a swing ride named Zumer (later Swinger Zinger) and a plane ride named Red Baron (later Dora the Explorer's Sea Planes). A set of upcharge go-karts named Grand Prix were located within the Thunderbolt's footprint rounded out the attractions in Country Fair. Also in 1982, a second themed area opened known as Gum Tree Gully. The area's main attraction was the Australian Koala Theatre which showed the animatronic show Country Jamboree at the time.

In 1983, expanded again adding another two new themed areas. The first was the Blue Lagoon water park. Attractions at Blue Lagoon included a body slide named Aqualoop Flume Ride, a tube ride named Krakatoa's Revenge, and a toboggan ride named Toboggan Ride. A large lagoon swimming pool and a children's pool rounded out the water park. The second themed area was Village Green which was constructed to provide a link between the 1982 additions of Country Fair and Gum Tree Gully. Attractions at Village Green included a matterhorn ride named Avalanche, a set of Bertazzon bumper cars, a carousel, an arcade and a miniature train ride named Little Puff which ventured through an area known as The Enchanted Forest. Country Fair was also expanded with the addition of the Enterprise (later Reef Diver) and a Chance Rides Trabant named Roulette (later Stingray). The park also introduced its third mascot, Belinda Brown.

In 1984, Dreamworld began seven-day trading after only being open Tuesday through to Thursday since 1981.

On 15 December 1986, Dreamworld unveiled Gold Rush Country (later the Town of Gold Rush), its eighth themed area. The area was located to the left of Central Plaza and featured two attractions. The first was a wild mouse roller coaster named the Eureka Mountain Mine Ride. Built by Brisbane company HyFab, the roller coaster was enclosed within a mountain with selected track segments venturing outside the mountain. The area's second attraction was a river rafting ride called Thunder River Rapids Ride. The ride's channel weaved around Gold Rush Country and under the Eureka Mountain Mine Ride. Also in 1986, the park opened the Music Bowl (later Dreamworld Amphitheatre and Dreamworld Studios) and had its first after-dark opening.

In 1987, Koala Country opened as the park's ninth themed area. Spanning , the area was home to many native animals including 13 koalas. Two years later the Skylink Chairlift opened providing a link between Koala Country and Gold Rush Country. The  ride was manufactured by Ferrari and saw pairs of guests board one of 38 carriages for a three-and-a-half minute ride. The ride was originally located at Magic Mountain, Nobby Beach before being relocated to the park.

1990s

On 26 December 1993, Dreamworld opened its tenth themed area, Ocean Parade. The area took over the northern portion of the existing Country Fair themed area. Ocean Parade's flagship attraction was the $6 million Wipeout. The ride was the world's first Vekoma Wakiki Wave Super Flip – a ride similar to a traditional Top Spin. The Roulette was rethemed to become the Stingray and relocated to a new location at the same time.

In June 1995, Dreamworld opened Tiger Island where Bengal and white tigers interact with keepers in the same exhibit. At the same time they also constructed a path to connect Gum Tree Gully with Koala Country. Along this path they opened the Riverwalk Restaurant (later renamed Billabong BBQ and Buffet).

In the mid-1990s, Dreamworld entered into an agreement with Swiss amusement ride manufacturer Intamin to construct the -high Dreamworld Tower at a cost of over $1 million. On 23 January 1997, the world's tallest and fastest roller coaster opened on the tower. The car then returns the way it came. The Tower of Terror was the first ride of its type and is currently one of only two in the world (the other Reverse Freefall Coaster being Superman: Escape from Krypton at Six Flags Magic Mountain). Construction of the tower required the rerouting of the Avis Vintage Cars track around the tower.

Later in 1997, Dreamworld manufactured and opened the Creature Cruise. The ride was a free flow boat ride located in the northern portion of Village Oval. It would take riders on a gentle cruise past 140 handcrafted animals, birds and marine life in their respective habitats. In 1998, four Bengal Tiger cubs (Rama, Taj, Sultan and Sita) and several pure bred dingoes were born.

On 26 December 1998, a second ride was constructed on the Dreamworld Tower. Similar to the Tower of Terror, The Giant Drop was designed by Intamin. At a cost of $12 million, it opened as the world's tallest and fastest freefall ride.

In December 1999, Dreamworld added a variety of kids rides in a new themed area called Kennyland. The area took over the northern portion of Village Oval. It consisted of a selection of rides and attractions including Wild Wheels (SBF Visa Group Convoy), Dream Copters (SBF Visa Group Jets), Adventure Trails (jumping castle) and Kenny's Cars (SBF Visa Group Mini Bumper Cars). Around the same time, the Creature Cruise was converted from a boat ride into a walkthrough attraction.

2000s

In January 2001, the Australian Wildlife Experience opened after the multimillion-dollar refurbishment and expansion of Koala Country to feature new areas based upon wetlands, woodlands, rainforest and arid desert. In April 2001, Big Brother Australia commenced broadcasting following the redevelopment of Dreamworld's Amphitheatre. On 23 June 2001, a temporary scare attraction called The Mummy Returns began operation. The attraction was the first of many of scare attractions to be created by Sudden Impact! Entertainment Company for Dreamworld. It closed on 8 July 2001. Also in 2001, two new Bengal tigers, Kato and Kaasha, were born in Tiger Island.

On 21 October 2001, Dreamworld announced that they would be adding the $5 million Cyclone roller coaster. On 26 December 2001, the Cyclone officially opened to the public. The ride was the former Big Dipper roller coaster at Luna Park Sydney. Designed by Arrow Dynamics, the Cyclone was a sit down custom looping roller coaster featuring 2 inversions.

In the first half of 2002, the entrance to the Tower of Terror was relocated to the opposite side of the track. This was followed by the closure of the Central Cafe, Kennyland and part of Village Oval. Shortly after, a temporary children's area opened in Gum Tree Gully. Known as the Kid's Carnival, the area featured several of the rides from Kennyland including the Dream Copters, Kenny Karts and Adventure Trails. A children's ferris wheel was also included in the lineup. In August 2002, it was announced that Dreamworld would be adding Nickelodeon Central, however, specific details at the time were sparse. After investing $7 million Dreamworld officially opened Nickelodeon Central on 26 December 2002. New attractions included Rugrats Runaway Reptar roller coaster, Wild Thornberry's Rainforest Rampage and the Slime Bowl. The Zumer from the Country Fair themed area was relocated to Nickelodeon Central and rethemed to Swinger Zinger. Kennyland's Dream Copters ride was relocated and resumed operation under the same name and theme. The existing Carousel, Bumper Bowl and Avalanche were renamed to Nick-O-Round, Rocket Power Bumper Beach and Angry Beavers Spooty Spin, respectively.

In 2003, Dreamworld further expanded its wildlife offerings by running the after hours, upcharge attraction Sunset Safari where guests are taken on a tour behind the scenes of Dreamworld's wildlife attractions. In August 2003, the Thunderbolt was closed. Dreamworld sought but failed to find a buyer for the ride, and Thunderbolt was demolished and sold for scrap metal in March 2004. Dreamworld has retained a section of track and at least one train in the park's back-of-house areas. At around the same time, the Dream Copters ride in Nickelodeon Central was rethemed to become Blues Skidoo. The retheme saw new dog-shaped vehicles added to the ride in place of the planes and helicopters it originally featured. A temporary scare attraction known as Lara Croft Tomb Raider – Enter the Tomb operated from 23 December 2003 until 18 April 2004.

In April 2004, construction began on what was rumoured to be a Teen Market Thrill Ride to open later in the year. To aid in the construction, the northern end of Ocean Parade was closed off to the public forcing guests to detour through Nickelodeon Central to get to the other rides that area, including the Cyclone and the Wipeout. In July 2004, Dreamworld announced that the ride was going to be an Intamin Gyro Swing, a duplicate of Maelstrom at Drayton Manor in the United Kingdom. On 18 September 2004, The Claw officially opened to the public.

On 15 March 2005, the Skylink Chairlift, which provided a link between Gold Rush Country and the Australian Wildlife Experience, closed. It remained standing for several months before the wires were removed. The support poles remain standing to this day. In July 2005, Gum Tree Gully closed to make way for Wiggles World. The world's first Wiggles World officially opened on 17 September 2005 with the Big Red Car Ride, Captain Feathersword's Ship and the Fun Spot.

In November 2005, the owners of Dreamworld announced that they would be investing $56 million in a separate water park located next to Dreamworld. The then-unnamed water park was scheduled to open in December 2006. In April 2006, Dreamworld's internal Blue Lagoon was closed. At around the same time, Dreamworld began constructing a Wave Loch FlowRider on Ocean Parade. It was constructed on part of the site of the former Thunderbolt roller coaster which was removed in 2004. On 23 June 2006, the attraction had its soft opening which was attended by the attraction's designer Tom Lochtefeld as well as several surfers, snowboarders, wakeboarders and skateboarders. The following day, the FlowRider officially opened to the public. On 7 November 2006, the Eureka Mountain Mine Ride closed and has remained standing but not operating to this day. On 8 December 2006, WhiteWater World opened as a separate gated complex as Blue Lagoon's replacement. On 26 December 2006, Nightmares, a temporary scary experience, featuring two different sections: The Freezer and Angoscia. It operated through to 7 July 2007.

In April 2007, two Sumatran Tiger cubs, Indah and Rahni, were born at Tiger Island. At around the same time, the Avis Vintage Cars were relocated from Rivertown to a new location in the Australian Wildlife Experience. In July 2007, it was announced that Dreamworld would be adding Mick Doohan's Motocoaster in time for the September school holidays. The ride would be a motorbike roller coaster manufactured by Intamin. On 30 September 2007, Mick Doohan's Motocoaster officially opened to the public.

On 9 June 2008, Tiger Island welcomed the birth of three Sumatran Tiger cubs: Ndari, Jaya and Shanti. On 20 June 2008, SpongeBob FlyPants, a Zamperla Kite Flyer opened as part of Nickelodeon Central. In the middle of 2008, the final series of Network Ten's Big Brother was produced leaving the house and studios standing empty upon completion. The Mummy: Tomb of the Dragon Emperor Live operated for a limited season between September 2008 and January 2009. It was a walkthrough scare attraction. In Ocean Parade, V8 Supercars RedLine opened on 26 December near the FlowRider and the Cyclone's entrance.

In February 2009, the Vortex was closed and removed to make way for AVPX which officially opened on 10 April 2009. AVPX is an indoor laser tag arena manufactured by Sudden Impact! Entertainment Company.

2010s

On 2 April 2010, the Illuminate Light & Laser Spectacular began seasonal operation in Main Street. The attraction is a light and laser show created by Australian entertainment company, Laservision. On 17 September 2010, the Tower of Terror relaunched as the Tower of Terror II featuring a new, reversed car. In late 2010, Dreamworld announced that they would begin celebrating their 30th birthday by holding the Summer Funomenon over the summer school holidays. The IMAX Theatre was renovated to become the Dreamworld Cinema. A roof was constructed over Main Street between the entrances for Ocean Parade and Nickelodeon Central. The Marketplace in Main Street was also upgraded. Also a new tiger cub named Pi (pronounced pie) was transferred to the park from Cairns Wildlife Safari Reserve.

On 16 February 2011, Ardent Leisure announced plans to have an Easter promotion where lions would be on temporary exhibition from National Zoo & Aquarium who were renovating their facilities. In March 2011, Dreamworld officially announced that The Lair would be themed to the Timbavati region in South Africa. The interactive exhibit would feature a triple laminated glass panel which allowed guests to view the lions up close. They also announced The Lair would be used for other exotic animal species in the future. The exhibit currently houses additional tigers from Tiger Island.

On 7 April 2011, Dreamworld announced that they would be adding a family thrill ride in June and a major thrill ride in September 2011. On 18 May 2011, the family thrill ride was officially announced to be a Zamperla Disk'O called Shockwave within Ocean Parade. The ride opened on 25 June 2011.

Towards the middle of 2011, elements of Nickelodeon theming from Nickelodeon Central started to be removed leading to speculation that the contract with the television network was being terminated. By the start of the winter holidays on 25 June 2011, all of the rides were renamed to a generic kids theme: Kid's World.

On 17 September 2011, Dreamworld opened BuzzSaw – a Maurer Söhne SkyLoop roller coaster. The opening of the ride was timed with the renaming of Gold Rush Country to the Town of Gold Rush.

On 10 November 2011, Dreamworld announced a three-stage plan to incorporate DreamWorks Animation films and characters into its theme park. The three phases were expected to cost $10 million to complete. On 19 December 2011, Dreamworld opened the DreamWorks Holiday Shrektacular Show which featured 8 DreamWorks Animation characters live on stage. This was the first of a three-phase plan to incorporate the characters into the theme park. The show concluded on 27 January 2012. On 1 February 2012, following the peak season, Dreamworld closed most of the rides in Kid's World. The  area was rethemed into the DreamWorks Experience precinct over a period of two months. This phase was officially opened to the public on 31 March 2012.

On 9 July 2012 at Dreamworld, the Australian Minister for Tourism Martin Ferguson announced that the Australian Government would contribute $1.1 million to the redevelopment of the Australian Wildlife Experience into an Indigenous tourist experience. Dreamworld's owners, Ardent Leisure, vowed to match the grant in order to have the $2.2 million redeveloped area open by late 2013. Dreamworld have previously worked with the Indigenous community to develop the Dreamworld Dreamtime show in 2010 and 2011. 

The Dreamworld Wildlife Foundation (DWF) works with wildlife groups and brings financial support to conservation of wildlife on a global scale. DWF, founded in March 2012 is international and non-governmental. DWF is based out of Dreamworld amusement and houses some native species at the park such as Koalas, Dingos and Tigers. These animals are available for encounters and picture to be taken with them. These services are available to this day (as of September, 2022.) 

On 15 July 2012, Dreamworld closed the Avalanche in order for construction to continue on the final development phase of the DreamWorks Animation alliance, Kung Fu Panda: Land of Awesomeness. The new area included a new set of bumper cars, Skadoosh, as well as Dreamworld's eighth thrill ride, Pandamonium, and the Kung Fu Academy.

2020s

Commercial history
Dreamworld was originally owned by John Longhurst, the park's creator. In 1989, Bruce Jenkin's Dreamco purchased the park from Longhurst. The Dreamco company went into administration one year later. During its time in receiveship, Dreamworld's management team invested $40 million on advertising and capital injections for the park. Dreamworld exited liquidation in 1994. The following year the park was sold to Kua Phek Long who was a Singaporean businessman. On 11 June 1998, Macquarie Group subsidiary Macquarie Leisure Trust Group was formed with its first action being the purchase of Dreamworld. In June 2009, Macquarie Leisure was renamed to Ardent Leisure as part of a corporate repositioning which saw the company split from Macquarie. Ardent Leisure continues to own and operate Dreamworld to this day.

Attraction listing

Like all theme parks, attractions are sometimes closed due to age and replaced with more contemporary attractions. Dreamworld has seen this action used a great deal of times, with many attraction closures, replacements and expansions.

Achievements

Park awards

Ride records

See also

 WhiteWater World
 Dreamworld's 30th Birthday
 Thunder River Rapids Ride incident

Notes

References

External links
 
 Dreamworld database entry at Parkz
 Dreamworld Dreamsite

 History
History of Gold Coast, Queensland